Live! is a live album by Chuck Berry, released in 1994 by Columbia River Entertainment Group.

Track listing
"School Days" – 3:09
"Sweet Little Sixteen" – 2:58
"Roll Over Beethoven" – 3:36
"Every Day I Have the Blues" – 4:00
"Bio" – 3:01
Medley: "Maybellene"/"Mountain Dew" – 2:46
"Let It Rock" – 3:42
Medley: "Carol"/"Little Queenie" – 4:15
"Key to the Highway" – 5:07
"Got My Mojo Working" – 3:29
"Reelin' and Rockin'" – 8:59
"Johnny B. Goode" – 2:53

Personnel
Chuck Berry – guitar, vocals
Ingrid Berry - vocals on "Keys to the Highway", "Got My Mojo Working" and "Reelin' and Rockin'"

References

Chuck Berry live albums
1994 live albums